Hans Uwe Hielscher (born 1945) is a German organist and composer. He was organist and carillonneur at the Marktkirche in Wiesbaden, Hesse, Germany, from 1979 to 2009, and has played internationally as a concert organist.

Career 

Hielscher studied church music at the Hochschule für Musik Detmold (A), and carillon in Utrecht. From 1969 - 1973 he was church musician in Juist and from 1973 - 1979 in Bielefeld. He has been the organist and carillonneur at the Marktkirche in Wiesbaden since 1979. He created a series of weekly free recitals called Orgelmusik zur Marktzeit (organ music at market time) on Saturdays at 11:30 a.m., in which he or sometimes a guest organist perform seasonal music. The 2000th event is on 7 December 2019. He has appeared in a regular concert on New Year's Eve together with his colleague at St. Bonifatius, Gabriel Dessauer until 2010, whereas he played with his successor  since 2011.

In 1985 he worked at the Immanuel Presbyterian Church in Los Angeles in exchange with Samuel Swartz, and he has been teaching at the University of Redlands in California since 1986.

Hielscher is active as a concert organist and has played more than 3000 organ concerts worldwide. He retired from the position at the Marktkirche in 2009 but has kept the tradition of Orgelmusik zur Marktzeit.

Awards
 Chevalier de l'Ordre des Arts et des Lettres (1985)

Publications
 Alexandre Guilmant: Leben und Werk
 Berühmte Orgeln der USA
 Die Oberlinger-Orgel in der Marktkirche Wiesbaden
 Französische Orgelkunst der Spätromantik

Compositions
 California wine suite
 Variations sur „Frère Jacques“
 American folksongs
 Mosaik
 Weihnachtskantate

References

External links 
 Hans Uwe Hielscher website
 
 Entries for Hans Uwe Hielscher on WorldCat

1945 births
Carillonneurs
Living people
German classical organists
German male organists
Chevaliers of the Ordre des Arts et des Lettres
People from Wiesbaden
Classical composers of church music
Hochschule für Musik Detmold alumni
Male classical composers
21st-century organists
21st-century German male musicians
Male classical organists